Shahedian (沙河店) may refer to the following locations in China:

 Shahedian, Zhao County, town in southwestern Hebei
 Shahedian, Biyang County, town in Biyang County, Henan